Tünekpınar is a village in the Eruh District of Siirt Province in Turkey. The village is populated by Kurds of the Botikan tribe and had a population of 51 in 2022.

Population history 
The village had a population of 14 in 2007, was unpopulated between 2008 and 2020, and grew its population to 46 in 2021 and 51 in 2022.

References 

Villages in Eruh District
Kurdish settlements in Siirt Province